Lapinlahti is a quarter in Helsinki, part of the Länsisatama neighbourhood.

Lapinlahti Hospital, completed in 1841, was the first mental hospital in Finland.

External links 

Länsisatama
Quarters of Helsinki